Mediamax news agency is a news agency based in Yerevan, Armenia. It launched its own internet site on 28 August 2001.

Mediamax offers traditional and new media services secured by fine-tuned internal synergy.

See also 

 Mass media in Armenia

References

External links 
 

News agencies based in Armenia